Katerina D'Onofrio Dibós (born 6 June 1978) is a Peruvian actress.

Career
In 2006 Katerina D'Onofrio appeared on Season 2 of La Gran Sangre as Venus, the leading role that led her to fame. A member of the group "the evil goddesses", she played the partner of a main character at the time of his death.

In early 2011 she appeared in The Bad Intentions as Ines, the mother of Cayetana. Directed by Rosario García-Montero, this won the Best Peruvian Film Award at the Lima Festival and the Special Jury Prize at the Gramado Film Festival. In August 2011 she played Leonor in the telenovela , a woman born in the Viceroyalty of New Granada.

In 2014, she debuted on the series  as Lieutenant Angélica.

In 2015 she was invited to perform at Microteatro-Lima in the successful play ¿Te comió la lengua el ratón?, where she played the character Paula. The play was written by Federico Abrill and Jimena Del Sante, directed by Del Sante, and co-starred the international actress Diana Quijano.

In 2017, D'Onofrio appeared in the Ecuadorian film Verano no miente.

Filmography

Films

Television

Theater
 Ángeles (2003, dir: Javier Echevarría)
 Jesus Christ Superstar (2006, dir: Mateo Chiarella)
 El mago en el país de las maravillas (2006,)
 El duende (2008, dir: Ernesto Barraza Eléspuru)
 Un musical para navidad (2008)
 El misterio del ramo de rosas as the nurse (2009, dir: Carlos Tolentino)
 Viaje a la luna (2010,)
 Jarana (2010, dir: Carlos Tolentino)
 Break as Pamela (2011, dir: Ernesto Barraza Eléspuru)
 Ficción (2011, Spanish Cultural Center)
 Botella borracha as Jimena (2012–13)
 Karamazov as Grushenka (2014,  dir: Mariana de Althaus)
 El sistema solar as Edurne (2012–15)
 Una historia Original de Vanessa Vizcarra (2015)
 ¿Te comió la lengua el ratón? as Paula (2015)

Awards and nominations

References

External links
 

1978 births
21st-century Peruvian actresses
Actresses from Lima
Living people
Peruvian film actresses
Peruvian musical theatre actresses
Peruvian telenovela actresses